Seventh-seeded Margaret Smith defeated Jan Lehane 7–5, 6–2 in the final to win the women's singles tennis title at the 1960 Australian Championships. This was Smith's 1st of a record 24 Grand Slam titles.

Seeds
The seeded players are listed below. Margaret Smith is the champion; others show the round in which they were eliminated.

 Maria Bueno (quarterfinals)
 Christine Truman (semifinals)
 Jan Lehane (finalist)
 Mary Carter Reitano (semifinals)
 Lorraine Coghlan (quarterfinals)
 Beverley Rae (second round)
 Margaret Smith (champion)
 Betty Holstein (second round)

Draw

Key
 Q = Qualifier
 WC = Wild card
 LL = Lucky loser
 r = Retired

Finals

Earlier rounds

Section 1

Section 2

External links
 

1960 in Australian tennis
1962
1960 in women's tennis
1960 in Australian women's sport